The 1964 Milwaukee Braves season was the team's 12th season in Milwaukee while also the 94th season overall. The fifth-place Braves finished the season with an  record, five games behind the National League and World Series champion 

Milwaukee finished the season with ten wins in the final eleven games; the season's home attendance was  their highest since 1961, and the highest of the last four seasons in Milwaukee (1962–65).

It was the franchise's penultimate season in Milwaukee. The franchise had attempted to move to Atlanta shortly after  it was delayed  and the team relocated for the 1966 season.

Offseason 
 October 10, 1963: Claude Raymond was drafted from the Braves by the Houston Colt .45s in a 1963 special draft.
 December 2, 1963: Lou Jackson was drafted from the Braves by the Baltimore Orioles in the 1963 Rule 5 draft.
 March 22, 1964: Cito Gaston was signed as an amateur free agent by the Braves.
 Prior to 1964 season: Skip Guinn was signed as an amateur free agent by the Braves.

Regular season

Season standings

Record vs. opponents

Notable transactions 
 April 9, 1964: Bob Uecker was traded by the Braves to the St. Louis Cardinals for Jimmie Coker and Gary Kolb.
 May 12, 1964: Gus Bell was released by the Braves.
 June 3, 1964: Len Gabrielson was traded by the Braves to the Chicago Cubs for $40,000. The Cubs completed the deal by sending Merritt Ranew to the Braves on June 8.
 August 8, 1964: Dennis Ribant and cash were traded by the Braves to the New York Mets for Frank Lary.
 August 14, 1964: Carl Morton was signed as an amateur free agent by the Braves.
 August 23, 1964: Jimmie Coker was purchased from the Braves by the Cincinnati Reds for $35,000.

Roster

Player stats

Batting

Starters by position 
Note: Pos = Position; G = Games played; AB = At bats; H = Hits; Avg. = Batting average; HR = Home runs; RBI = Runs batted in

Other batters 
Note: G = Games played; AB = At bats; H = Hits; Avg. = Batting average; HR = Home runs; RBI = Runs batted in

Pitching

Starting pitchers 
Note: G = Games pitched; IP = Innings pitched; W = Wins; L = Losses; ERA = Earned run average; SO = Strikeouts

Other pitchers 
Note: G = Games pitched; IP = Innings pitched; W = Wins; L = Losses; ERA = Earned run average; SO = Strikeouts

Relief pitchers 
Note: G = Games pitched; W = Wins; L = Losses; SV = Saves; ERA = Earned run average; SO = Strikeouts

Farm system 

LEAGUE CHAMPIONS: Yakima, SRL BravesToronto affiliation shared with Washington Senators

Notes

References 

1964 Milwaukee Braves season at Baseball Reference

Milwaukee Braves seasons
Milwaukee Braves season
Milwauk